IACP may be:

 International Academy of Compounding Pharmacists
 International Association of Canine Professionals
 International Association of Chiefs of Police
 International Association for China Planning
 International Association of Culinary Professionals
 Independent Association of Continental Pilots